Amazophrynella minuta is a species of toad in the family Bufonidae. It is found in Bolivia, Brazil, Colombia, Ecuador, French Guiana, Guyana, Peru, Suriname, and Venezuela. However, because of the poor description of new Amazophrynella species, it is not clear which old records refer to this species and which records refer to the new species.

Amazophrynella minuta is a forest floor species found in old and second-growth tropical moist forest and premontane humid forest. Breeding takes place in semi-permanent and temporary waterbodies. It is threatened by habitat loss.

References

minuta
Amphibians of Bolivia
Amphibians of Brazil
Amphibians of Colombia
Amphibians of Ecuador
Amphibians of French Guiana
Amphibians of Guyana
Amphibians of Peru
Amphibians of Suriname
Amphibians of Venezuela
Amphibians described in 1941
Taxonomy articles created by Polbot